Charly Keita (born 23 August 1999) is an Ivorian professional footballer who plays as a striker for Biel-Bienne on loan from Ligue 1 club Clermont Foot.

Career
A youth product of Pau, Keita was promoted to the club's first team in September 2021. He made his debut for the club as a late sub in a 2–1 Ligue 2 loss to Quevilly-Rouen on 11 December 2021, scoring his side's only goal in the 87th minute. On 1 January 2022, he moved to Sedan.

On 25 January 2023, Keita signed for Ligue 1 club Clermont Foot on an eighteen-month contract, joining partner Swiss 1. Liga club Biel-Bienne on loan until the end of the season.

References

External links
 

1999 births
Living people
People from Abidjan
Ivorian footballers
Pau FC players
CS Sedan Ardennes players
Clermont Foot players
FC Biel-Bienne players
Ligue 2 players
Championnat National 3 players
Association football forwards
Ivorian expatriate footballers
Ivorian expatriate sportspeople in France
Expatriate footballers in France
Ivorian expatriate sportspeople in Switzerland
Expatriate footballers in Switzerland